State Highway 131 (SH-131 or OK-131) is a  state highway in southeastern Oklahoma. It runs through Coal and Atoka Counties. It has no lettered spur routes.

Route description
From the terminus at State Highway 31, SH-131 heads northeast towards the unincorporated town of Cairo. North of Phillips Hollow, the route crosses a small stream, an eventual tributary of Coal Creek. The highway then crosses the Coal–Atoka county line.

SH-131 then becomes a more easterly route. After bridging North Boggy Creek, the route swings around to the north briefly, before returning to a due east heading. The road then crosses Fivemile Creek. Five miles (8.0 km) east of Wardville, it ends at US-69 south of Kiowa.

History
State Highway 131 first appeared on the 1959 state road map. When it was originally commissioned, it began at its present-day western terminus near Cairo, but stopped short of the present-day eastern terminus, instead ending in Wardville. SH-131 had these termini for over twenty years. The route was extended to US-69 in 1985. No further changes to the highway have been made since the extension.

Junction list

References

External links

SH-131 at OKHighways
SH-131 at Roadklahoma

131
Transportation in Coal County, Oklahoma
Transportation in Atoka County, Oklahoma